Cotinis is a genus of scarab beetles in the subfamily Cetoniinae found throughout North and South America. At least two species (Cotinis mutabilis and Cotinis nitida) are common pests. The genus was erected by Hermann Burmeister in 1842.

Species
The genus contains the following species:

Cotinis aliena Woodruff, 2008
Cotinis antonii (Dugés, 1878)
Cotinis barthelemyi (Gory & Percheron, 1833)
Cotinis beraudi Delgado, 1998
Cotinis boylei Goodrich, 1966
Cotinis columbica Burmeister, 1842
Cotinis fuscopicea Goodrich, 1966
Cotinis ibarrai Deloya & Ratcliffe, 1988
Cotinis impia (Fall, 1905)
Cotinis laticornis Bates, 1889
Cotinis lebasi (Gory & Percheron, 1833)
Cotinis lemoulti Antoine, 2007
Cotinis mutabilis (Gory & Percheron, 1833)
Cotinis nitida (Linnaeus, 1764)
Cotinis olivia Bates, 1889
Cotinis orientalis Deloya & Ratcliffe, 1988
Cotinis pauperula Burmeister, 1847
Cotinis polita Janson, 1876
Cotinis pokornyi Deloya, Ibáñez-Bernal, & Nogueira, 2000
Cotinis producta Bates, 1889
Cotinis pueblensis Bates, 1889
Cotinis punctatostriata Bates, 1889
Cotinis rufipennis Bates, 1889
Cotinis sinitoc Deloya, Ibáñez-Bernal, & Nogueira, 2000
Cotinis sphyracera Deloya & Ratcliffe, 1988
Cotinis subviolacea (Gory & Percheron, 1833)
Cotinis viridicyanea (Perbosc, 1839)

References

Scarabaeidae genera
Cetoniinae